Pranayakadha is a 2014 Malayalam romance-drama film written and directed by Aadhi Balakrishnan. Starring actors Arun V. Narayan and Swarna Thomas in the lead roles, the film was released on 17 January 2014.

Cast & Crew 
 Arun V. Narayan
 Swarna Thomas
 Balachandran Chullikkadu
 Firos P.S.
 Govindankutty Adoor
 Jayaprakash Kuloor
 Joy Mathew
 Thara Kalyan
 Urmila Unni
Praveen B Menon - production controller

Music 

The soundtrack album of the film has been composed by Alphons Joseph, while lyrics have been penned by Murukan Kattakada and Rafeeq Ahammed. On 25 June 2013, the making of the song "Manjil Mungippongum" was leaked on the net by Metromatinee.com.

Track listing

References

External links 
 Official Movie Trailer

2010s Malayalam-language films
Films scored by Alphons Joseph